David Schafer (born 1955) is an American visual and sound artist based in Los Angeles, whose practice integrates aural, textual, graphic and sculptural elements to create installations, public art and individual works that critics describe as immersive, spatial experiments. His approach combines self-consciously formalist aesthetics, a Pop Art sensibility, and postmodern Deconstructionist intent, often appropriating and reframing cultural motifs in order to investigate systems of historical and cultural memory, built space, and language. Schafer has exhibited nationally and internationally in museums, galleries and public spaces, including the Whitney Museum of American Art, MoMA PS1, The Drawing Center, MASS MoCA, Baltimore Museum of Art, Long Beach Museum of Art, SculptureCenter, and Vleeshal Middelburg (the Netherlands). He has received awards from the Pollock-Krasner Foundation and National Endowment for the Arts, among others, as well as public commissions from the Public Art Fund of New York and the Los Angeles County Arts Commission. Los Angeles Times critic Leah Ollman describes his work as a "heady jumble" producing collisions, contradictions and convergences at the intersection of architecture, sound, sculpture, language and theory in order to "disrupt communication intentionally, incisively, through strategies of fragmentation and interruption." Schafer has taught sculpture, art theory, digital media and sound at institutions on the East and West coasts since 1985, and is currently on the Fine Arts faculty at Art Center College of Design in Los Angeles.

Biography
Schafer was born in Kansas City, Missouri. He attended the Kansas City Art Institute, where he studied environmental graphics with Victor Papanek and was influenced by sculptor Dale Eldred, before completing a Fine Art degree at the University of Missouri–Kansas City in 1978. He pursued graduate studies at the University of Texas, earning an MFA in Sculpture (1983) and minor in Mechanical Engineering; interdisciplinary work there with Peter Saul, Robert Yarber, and visiting professors John Baldessari, Vito Acconci and Siah Armajani influenced his understanding of the built world and use of social critique and humor. In 1983, Schafer moved to New York City and worked for artists Dennis Oppenheim and Alice Aycock; their use of research, historical and philosophical references, drawing, site specificity, and public scale also had a lasting impression on his work. 

Schafer began to receive public recognition in the late 1980s, including an NEA Sculpture Award (1988), a Sculpture Chicago Artist-in-Residence (1989), and the first of three Public Art Fund of New York City commissions (1988–93); while in New York, he also exhibited at PS1, Artists Space, White Columns and Art in General, and began his teaching career at the School of Visual Arts (1985–96) and Parsons School of Design (1994–6). In 1996, he moved to Los Angeles, where he has continued to exhibit widely in galleries, museums and public projects, while expanding into sound works and performances. He has also taught at Otis College of Art and Design (1996–2000), Cal Arts (2002), and Art Center College of Design (1998–2007), where as a full professor he developed a sculpture program bridging Fine Arts, Digital Media, and Environmental Design. After a return to New York and positions at Parsons (2007–10) and the Cornell Art and Architecture Program (2011–2), he returned to Art Center in 2013, where he founded and developed the school's Sound Lab in Fine Art program and sound curriculum.

Work
Because it is multidisciplinary, Schafer's work can be difficult to categorize; he has created sculpture, installations and public art projects that may incorporate built structures, printed and sound elements, and text, as well as sound works, all of which engage cultural and historical works, tropes and texts whose ideas he reconfigures visually, spatially or sonically for reconsideration. Artforum critic Jan Tumlir traces Schafer's artistic strategies to his emergence in the 1980s amid the theoretical flowering of deconstruction and its critical dismantling of historical and cultural conventions, including modernism.

Sculpture and installations
Schafer's early art explored relationships between public and private space and perception through site-specific works that implicated sculpture as a staged experience and disrupted exhibition/audience and viewer/art object conventions, often through physical engagement. Folly (1986, PS1), Western Agenda (1991, Artists Space) and Model for Wild Harmony (1993) were skeletal, theatrical sculptures referencing Russian Constructivism that invited viewers to swing on them or ascend ladders or suspended platforms, subverting viewing conventions by reversing the roles of observer and observed, audience and object.
 

In the mid-1990s, Schafer began incorporating digital printing and fabrication processes into works that focused on social space, mechanisms of social control, commodity consumption, cultural memory, and everyday objects and materials. Mother Mall (1996) featured a large modular sculpture resembling a quasi-organic space vessel or shopping mall model (including Muzak accompaniment) that referenced science-fiction and suburban dystopias; it was set on a ring of sawhorses surrounded by wall works appropriating banal, consumer-culture ephemera that critic Peter Frank described as "suffused with the relentless cheesiness and ravenous narcissism of [various] verbal symptoms of our alienated stupefaction." Cluster 38 (1997) and Stepped Density (1999–2001) reworked the ergonomics of fast-food furniture design and rules governing public space, creating what The Washington Post called "Pop-artish, tongue-in-cheek" sculptures of geometric rigor and high finish "hover[ing] in perfect middle ground between high formalist aesthetics and low commercial culture." How High Is Up? (2003–4) riffed on architectural models, transforming a still image of an improbable structure made out of chaotically arranged I-beams from a Three Stooges episode into a gleaming, Anthony Caro-like abstract sculpture; with detailed computer renderings and posters comically referencing Frank Gehry-style, Deconstructivist architecture, the installation enacted a cultural leveling, imbuing an object meant to represent human error and chaos with authority and rationality.

Spoken-word soundtracks and digital prints increasingly came to the fore in Schafer's work in the 2000s (much of it gathered in the retrospective-like exhibition, Models of Disorder, 2015); this later work investigated established ideas about history, language and truth (and their underlying patriarchal structures) through Modernist and pop-culture works and texts. What Should a Museum Sound Like? (2010, Whitney Biennial) presented a digitally fabricated, sound-equipped Whitney Museum sculpture playing an actor's recording of text by the museum's architect, Marcel Breuer, which was distorted with sounds created by transcoding the museum floorplans and drawings with a sound design program. What Should a Painter Do? (2011) referenced a Barnett Newman painting series with text works, audio of Newman explaining his ideas, and a bare-bones, De Stijl-like sculptural installation. In both cases, the grand formalist theories referenced by the structures and recordings are undermined by garbled, chaotic soundtracks, suggesting alternative perspectives for assessing such claims to truth. Four Letters to Mahler (2013) explored similar ideas and strategies based on letters written by Arnold Schoenberg to Gustav Mahler.

Public projects
Schafer executed several public art commissions early in his career, including Model Q (1989, Chicago), Altered Sites (1988, Philadelphia), and three from New York's Public Art Fund: Plaza of the First Reader (1988, Brooklyn), Liberty Prop (1991), and New Century Trellis, (1993, MetroTech Center, Brooklyn). Liberty Prop (1991, in collaboration with architect Jeffrey Cole) was a gazebo-like installation in City Hall Park, a site of contemporary and Revolutionary-period demonstrations, including the first Sons of Liberty "Liberty Pole" display. The installation reflected on the complexities and contradictions of liberty, juxtaposing the rote memorization, oversimplification, and commodification endemic to American patriotic discourse with the site's commemoration of revolutionary thought, speech and action. It featured billboards with enlarged croppings of the American flag and commercial trademark symbols, bold colors and forms alluding to Russian Constructivist Agitprop, and structural elements (boardwalk, bridge, picket fence) whose practical functions were undermined; the billboard insides reproduced flashcard-like definitions and questions about the Constitution and Bill of Rights taken from a high school textbook. 

 
Pastoral Mirage (1993) was a multi-site installation of fourteen large, yellow signs in the landscape of Brooklyn's Prospect Park displaying enigmatic quotes from the park's designer, Frederick Law Olmsted, as guides to the park as a work of art and vision. Challenging in their 19th-century language, ideas and context and bold, utilitarian design—which ran counter to typical, decorative signage—the signs sought to restore the hidden narratives in Olmsted's vision revealing the gap between his lofty intentions and present-day park usage. Critic Arlene Raven situated the work in the Community Arts tradition, observing that it "invites reflections on the future possibilities of peace embedded in an enduring heritage of past ideals," while also partaking in the "stormy entanglements" of contemporary public life, in this case, some resistance and confusion among park-goers.

 
Schafer's later public works demonstrate his growing embrace of technology, sampling culture and sound. For Separated United Forms (2009, Huntington Hospital, Pasadena; documented in an eponymous Charta Art Books publication), he used a medical hand-held, 3D body scanner to appropriate forms from a Henry Moore marble work, Reclining Form (1966), which were digitally reconfigured and remixed into a final, biomorphic image that was cast without a physical prototype as a monumental pair of 1,500-pound bronze sculptures. The work's production and restaging of organic form outside the convalescent facility alludes to the colonization of the body in both art (e.g., Moore's abstract, biomorphic notion of "Vitalism") and the medical industry's technological gaze. The five-day, interdepartmental The Schoenberg Soundways (2015, USC) sought to recover the lost campus legacy of composer and former USC teacher, Arnold Schoenberg, whose archives there were moved to Vienna. In addition to live events, it featured five campus delivery trucks outfitted with amplified speakers and informative signage, each playing a dedicated, repeated Schoenberg composition and intersecting randomly on indeterminant delivery routes to create John Cage-like chance moments of sound.

Sound works and performances
Schafer has also created electronic noise and processed recordings, live signal manipulation, programming events and live sound performances under the moniker of DSE since 2009. This work—like his other work—approaches sound as language and an expressive, malleable material, and often questions and disrupts the structural authority of intelligibility, context and sonic/spatial orientation. Schafer has performed sound at LACE, Human Resources and David Kordansky Gallery in Los Angeles, and Printed Matter, Inc., Silent Barn, The Invisible Dog Art Center and Roulette in New York, among other venues. His sound performance for the 2010 Whitney Biennial is included in the book Noise Channels: Glitch and Error in Digital Culture (2011), and his sound works have been included in curated radio programs in Lisbon, Paris, Glasgow, and Berlin. For his two-CD collection, x10R.1–x1-R.2, Schafer re-sequenced ten easy-listening records and superimposed them on top of one another to create a dense, cacophonous blanket of non-stop sound that reviewers described as a disorienting, "seething musical Frankenstein" revealing the repressive and coercive side of Muzak. In 2013, he released DSENOISE, a limited-edition boxed set of 12 CDs. An example of his writing on sound appears in the anthology, Site of Sound Volume 2 (2011).

Recognition
Schafer has received awards from the Pollock-Krasner Foundation (2018), Center for Cultural Innovation (2015), USC Visions and Voices Initiative (2014), Los Angeles County Percent for Public Art Program (commission, 2006), National Endowment for the Arts (award in Sculpture, 1989), Sculpture Chicago (Artist-in-Residence, 1989), Artists Space (1986), and the Public Art Fund Commission in New York (commissions, 1989, 1991, 1993; Artist-in-Residence, 1985).

References

External links
 David Schafer Website
 David Schafer blog
 David Schafer on Ubu Web
 DSE David Schafer on iTunes
 DSE David Schafer on Bandcamp

American conceptual artists
American installation artists
Sculptors from California
Artists from Los Angeles
University of Missouri–Kansas City alumni
University of Texas alumni
People from Kansas City, Missouri
Living people
1955 births